Yang Xiao is a professor of computer science at the University of Alabama.

Biography
Yang Xiao currently is a Full Professor of Department of Computer Science at the University of Alabama, Tuscaloosa, AL, USA. He obtained his M.S. and Ph.D. degrees in Computer Science and Engineering at Wright State University, Dayton, Ohio, USA, and his B.S. and M.S. degrees in computational mathematics at Jilin University, Changchun, China. His current research interests include Cyber Physical Systems, Internet of Things, Security, Wireless Networks, Smart Grid, and Telemedicine. He has published over 280 SCI-indexed journal papers (including over 50 IEEE/ACM transactions papers) and over 250 EI indexed refereed conference papers and book chapters related to these research areas. His research has been supported by the U.S. NSF, U.S. Army Research, GENI, Fleet Industrial Supply Center-San Diego, FIATECH, and The University of Alabama's Research Grants Committee.

Xiao was a Voting Member of IEEE 802.11 Working Group from 2001 to 2004, involving IEEE 802.11 (WIFI) standardization work. He is an IEEE Fellow (FIEEE) and an IET Fellow (previously IEE) (FIET). He served/serves as a Panelist for the U.S. National Science Foundation (NSF), the U.S. Department of Energy (DOE), The Global Environment for Network Innovations (GENI), Canada Foundation for Innovation (CFI)'s Telecommunications expert committee, The Natural Sciences and Engineering Research Council of Canada (NSERC)'s Site Visit Committee (SVC), U.S. Army Medical Research & Materiel Command's (USAMRMC) Telemedicine & Advanced Technology Research Center (TATRC) via American Institute of Biological Sciences (AIBS), The National Defense Science and Engineering Graduate (NDSEG) Fellowships under the Department of Defense (DoD), The Science, Mathematics, Research for Transformation (SMART) Scholarship under DoD, and the Chinese Academy of Sciences (CAS), as well as a Referee/Reviewer for many national and international funding agencies. He currently serves as Editor-in-Chief for Cyber-Physical Systems (Journal). He had (s) been an editorial board or Associate Editor for 20 international journals, including IEEE Transactions on Systems, Man, and Cybernetics: Systems, during 2014 to 2015, IEEE Transactions on  Vehicular Technology, during 2007 to 2009, and IEEE Communications Survey and Tutorials, during 2007 to 2014. He served (s) as a Guest Editor for over 20 times for different international journals, including IEEE Network, IEEE Wireless Communications, and ACM/Springer Mobile Networks and Applications (MONET). In 2020, he was elected a fellow of the IEEE.

References

Living people
American computer scientists
Year of birth missing (living people)
Fellow Members of the IEEE
Wright State University alumni
University of Alabama in Huntsville faculty
Chinese computer scientists
Chinese expatriates in the United States
Expatriate academics in the United States